Massachusetts liberal is a phrase in American politics which is generally used as a derogatory political epithet by Republicans against Democrats who are from the Commonwealth of Massachusetts. It was most significantly used in the 1988 presidential race by then-Vice President George H. W. Bush against Governor Michael Dukakis, and again in the 2004 race by then-President George W. Bush against Senator John Kerry. The Democratic candidates (Dukakis, Kerry) lost both races. In the Republican 2012 presidential primary election Newt Gingrich used the phrase "Massachusetts moderate," based on the liberal pejorative, repeatedly against Mitt Romney, the former Governor of Massachusetts, whose main residence was a mansion in the state. Romney went on to win the nomination, but lost the presidential election.

Meanings of the phrase

The idea behind the usage of the phrase is that the state of Massachusetts is "against the mainstream" in comparison to other states.  Jane Elmes-Crahall, a professor who studies political rhetoric, has said, in swing and red states, "It [the phrase] still signals the antithesis of their [swing- and red-state] social and economic values." Hence, it is believed, people in these states will not vote for someone they believe to be a "Massachusetts liberal."

There are several specific ideologies that are implied in the phrase:
Being "soft on crime"; specifically, an example of this was the infamous Willie Horton incident, which was referenced by George H. W. Bush's presidential campaign against Governor of Massachusetts Michael Dukakis in 1988. Willie Horton was a convicted murderer who raped a woman while on a furlough granted by Dukakis.
Alleged support for higher taxes. Among some, the state has a reputation for high taxes (5% sales tax, just increased to 6.25%; 5.05% income tax), and some refer to it as "Taxachusetts."
Support for anti-war ideas. This particular inference comes from the 1972 Presidential race, when Massachusetts was the only state where antiwar Senator George McGovern defeated President Richard Nixon.
In more recent times, such as the 2004 presidential race, the term also is meant to point to the state's legalization of same-sex marriage. It was the first state where same-sex marriage became legal.

See also
Liberal elite
Politics of Massachusetts
San Francisco values

References

Politics of Massachusetts
Political terminology of the United States
Political metaphors referring to people
Liberalism in the United States